Ab Garm-e Olya (also Romanized as Āb Garm-e ‘Olyā; also known as Āb Garmū, Āb Garmū-ye Bālā, and Garmū) is a village in Bakesh-e Do Rural District, in the Central District of Mamasani County, Fars Province, Iran. At the 2006 census, its population was 37, in 6 families.

References 

Populated places in Mamasani County